Stefan Panić (born 20 September 1992) is a Serbian footballer.

Club career

Early years
Born in Topola, Panić started his career in Mladenovac. Playing for the club with same name, he made 12 appearances from 2010 to 2011, and also spent a period in Portugal with C.D. Nacional in the meantime. In 2012, Panić was with Kovačevac. Playing for that club, he made 27 appearances, and scored 1 goal in the League Belgrade. He also played 1 cup match against Hajduk Kula, previously won Belgrade football cup, and also was a scorrer in the final of that competition.

Metalac Gornji Milanovac
Panić joined Metalac Gornji Milanovac for the second half of 2012–13 season. He made 2 appearances until the end of season. After adapting period, he spent mostly on the bench, or out of 18 players, he next season very well, and became constant in starting 11. He also played some matches in defence, as a centre-back. He played 25 league appearances, and one cup match, against Partizan, and scored 3 goals. He was a member of play-off match, against Rad, played in Gornji Milanovac. The 2014–15 season was very successful season for Stefan Panić. He missed only one match in the Serbian First League, because of yellow card suspension, he scored 3 league goals, as the previous season, he also made 2 cup appearances and 2 play-off match against Napredak Kruševac, after which Metalac promoted in the Serbian SuperLiga. He made his SuperLiga debut in the first fixture of 2015–16 season. Panić scored his first SuperLiga
goal for Metalac in the 20th fixture, against Novi Pazar. Ending of January 2016, Panić signed new contract with Metalac. On 2016 November 2016, Panić scored a goal against Red Star Belgrade on his 100th league match for Metalac.

Baník Ostrava
In summer 2017, Panić signed a two-year deal with Baník Ostrava. He made his debut for new club in the first fixture of the 2017–18 Czech First League season, replacing Tomáš Poznar in 86 minute of the match against Zbrojovka Brno.

International career
In January 2017, Panić was elected in a group of players from the Serbian football competition for a friendly match in San Diego, where he made his debut for the National team in a 0–0 draw against the United States. In May 2018, Panić was overlooked after the club's disappointing season from Serbia's 23-man squad for the 2018 FIFA World Cup in Russia.

Career statistics

Club

International

Honours
Mladenovac
Serbian League Belgrade: 2010–11
Kovačevac
Belgrade Cup: 2012

References

External links
 Stefan Panić stats at utakmica.rs 
 
 
 

1992 births
Living people
People from Topola
Serbian footballers
Association football midfielders
OFK Mladenovac players
FK Kovačevac players
FK Metalac Gornji Milanovac players
Serbian First League players
Serbian SuperLiga players
Serbian expatriate footballers
Expatriate footballers in Portugal
Serbian expatriate sportspeople in Portugal
Expatriate footballers in the Czech Republic
Serbian expatriate sportspeople in the Czech Republic
FC Baník Ostrava players
Czech First League players
Serbia international footballers
Serbian expatriate sportspeople in Latvia
Serbian expatriate sportspeople in Cyprus
Expatriate footballers in Latvia
Expatriate footballers in Cyprus
Riga FC players
Pafos FC players
Latvian Higher League players
Cypriot First Division players